The Dakshayani Velayudhan Award is an annual award in the name of Dakshayani Velayudhan, the first and lone Dalit woman in the Constituent Assembly. Instituted in 2019, the award is bestowed on women who contribute in empowering other women in the state of Kerala.

The Dakshayani Velayudhan Award was announced by the Kerala Finance Minister Dr. Thomas Isaac during the presentation of Kerala Budget 2019 in the Legislative Assembly on 31 January 2019. The budget earmarked Rs 2 crore for the award.

References

Constituent Assembly of India
Kerala
Kerala awards
Dalit